Below are the names and numbers of the 40 SR V "Schools" class locomotives designed by Richard Maunsell.  Another successful publicity campaign by the Southern Railway when named from 1930 onwards, they represented the public schools of England, initially due to their proximity to the railway that served them, but not all from the SR area. The class naming process consisted of pupils attending these schools visiting "their" engine during the naming ceremonies.

Remaining artefacts of other class members

When the locomotives were withdrawn from service, BR presented their nameplates to the appropriate schools:

A nameplate from 900, Eton, is now displayed in the School of Mechanics within Eton College.
A nameplate from 901, Winchester, is now displayed in the school's Design & Technology Centre, The Mill. 
A nameplate from 903, Charterhouse, was displayed in Charterhouse School's museum until auctioned by the school for £26,000 in 2002. The other nameplate is now displayed in the school's admissions office.
A nameplate from 905, Tonbridge, is displayed in the Physics Department of Tonbridge School.
A nameplate from 906, Sherborne, is now displayed in the day-room of one of the boarding houses of Sherborne School.
A nameplate from 907, Dulwich, is now displayed in Dulwich College by the college's Model Railway Society.
A nameplate from 908, Westminster, is now displayed in the science block of Westminster School.
A nameplate from 910, Merchant Taylors''', is now displayed outside the sixth form common room of Merchant Taylors' School, Northwood.
A nameplate from 911, Dover, is now displayed outside the Headmaster's Office at Dover College.
A nameplate from 912, Downside, is now displayed in Downside School.
A nameplate from 913  Christ's Hospital, is now displayed in the Model Railway Club at Christ's Hospital.
A nameplate from 914, Eastbourne, is now displayed in the big school theatre foyer of Eastbourne College.
A nameplate from 915, Brighton, is now displayed in the DT workshops of Brighton College.
A nameplate from 916, Whitgift, is now displayed in the Raeburn library at Whitgift School.
A nameplate from 917, Ardingly, is now displayed in the staff common room of Ardingly College.
A nameplate from 918, Hurstpierpoint, is now displayed in the science block of Hurstpierpoint College.
A nameplate from 923, originally named Uppingham, is now displayed in the Undercroft under the great hall of Uppingham School.
A nameplate from 923, Bradfield, is now displayed in the entrance corridor of the teachers' common room of Bradfield College.
The nameplates from 924, Haileybury, are now displayed in Haileybury and Imperial Service College Library above a photograph of the locomotive, and in the Archives in Clock House, Haileybury.
The nameplates from 929, Malvern, are now displayed in Malvern College Memorial Library below a photograph of the locomotive.
The tender from 929, Malvern, was converted to a snow plough, and was sold by the Maunsell Locomotive Society along with S15 locomotive 830 (to raise money to enable the purchase of 928 Stowe) and both were moved to the North Yorkshire Moors Railway.
A nameplate from 930, Radley, is now displayed in the stationery department of Radley College's school shop.
A nameplate from 931, King's - Wimbledon, is now displayed above the door of King's College School gymnasium.
The nameplate from 932, Blundell's, is now displayed in the History department of Blundell's School.
A nameplate from 933, Kings Canterbury, is currently displayed in the dining room of The King's School, Canterbury.
The tender from 934, St Lawrence, was converted to a snow plough, and the frames have been modified to run behind U-class No.1638 on the Bluebell Railway.
A nameplate from 935, Sevenoaks, is currently displayed in the Science and Technology Centre of Sevenoaks School with a scale model of the locomotive and photographs of Sevenoaks schoolboys 'inspecting' the new loco in 1935. The other nameplate is currently displayed in Arch Three of the Brighton Toy and Model Museum.
A nameplate from 936, Cranleigh, is currently displayed in the entry lobby of the Headmaster's Office of Cranleigh School.
A nameplate from 937, Epsom, was displayed in the Library of Epsom College.
A nameplate from 938, St Olaves, is displayed in the foyer of St Olave's Grammar School.
A nameplate from 939, Leatherhead'', was displayed along with a OO gauge model of the locomotive at St John's School, Leatherhead but was sold in Auction at Great Central Railwayana Auctions, Stoneleigh for £8000 in April 2013.

References 

4-4-0 locomotives
V "Schools" class
Railway locomotives introduced in 1930
British railway-related lists